In mathematics, a ridge function is any function  that can be written as the composition of a univariate function with an affine transformation, that is:  for some  and .
Coinage of the term 'ridge function' is often attributed to B.F. Logan and L.A. Shepp.

Relevance 
A ridge function is not susceptible to the curse of dimensionality, making it an instrumental tool in various estimation problems. This is a direct result of the fact that ridge functions are constant in  directions:
Then 

  

for all .

Ridge functions play an essential role in amongst others projection pursuit, generalized linear models, and as activation functions in neural networks. For a survey on ridge functions, see. For books on ridge functions, see.

References 

Functions and mappings